Richard Peabody (April 6, 1925 – December 27, 1999) was an American actor best known for his role as six-foot-six Pfc. Littlejohn on the 1960s series Combat!. Peabody worked in television, movies, radio, and print. He was tall and typecast himself as a western villain.

Biography

Peabody was a World War II Navy veteran, and had an early career in radio commercial production.

He anchored a TV news broadcast, hosted a radio talk show, wrote commercials and, in later years, wrote "Peabody's Place", a weekly newspaper column for the Mountain Democrat in Placerville, California.

He was in the movies Support Your Local Sheriff! and The Good Guys and the Bad Guys in 1969; both films were directed by Burt Kennedy who worked on Combat!. He also appeared in Your Money or Your Wife in 1972.

His main TV credit was all five seasons of Combat!. He was also in various episodes of Gunsmoke, Bonanza, and Daniel Boone.

Personal life
His wife Tina, a former model, wrote "Young Sarge", a song Dick Peabody recorded in 1965.

He died of prostate cancer at the age of 74.

Filmography

See also
Vic Morrow
Rick Jason

References

External links
 

1925 births
1999 deaths
American male television actors
American male film actors
Deaths from prostate cancer
Deaths from cancer in California
20th-century American male actors
United States Navy personnel of World War II